The 2021 Balloon World Cup is the first edition of the Balloon World Cup, a sporting event organized by Ibai Llanos and Gerard Piqué, based on a game of keep-up with a balloon that went viral on social media. It was held on 14 October 2021, at the convention center in the PortAventura World resort in the province of Tarragona. The tournament was broadcast live in its entirety on Llanos's Twitch channel, and culminated with Peruvian Francesco de la Cruz defeating German Jan Spiess in the final.

Background
Ibai was inspired to organize the tournament by a video of American siblings Antonio, Diego and Isabel Arredondo playing a game of keep-up with a balloon in their Canby, Oregon home, which Ibai tweeted with the caption "I want to buy the rights to this and set up a World Cup." Antonio and Diego attended the tournament in Spain to represent the United States, but Diego was eliminated early after a first-round loss to Cuba's Eric Guzmán González.

Staff
Llanos enlisted several panelists of Spanish sports talk show El chiringuito de Jugones for the event's staff, including former La Liga assistant referee Rafa Guerrero as one of the referees for the tournament's matches, and Alfredo Duro, Jorge D'Alessandro and Ander Cortés as commentators.

Competition rules

 Matches would last for 2 minutes, except for the final, which would last 5 minutes.
 Players had to touch the balloon with their hands, launching it upwards.
 Players could only touch the balloon once before their opponent touched it.
 A player is awarded a point when their opponent fails to touch the balloon before it hits the ground.
 The player who has scored the most points when time runs out wins the match.
 If the two players are tied when time runs out, they go to an overtime where they must use their head and feet instead of the hands to touch the balloon; the first player to score a point wins the match.

Format
In spite of the championship having initially been announced as a 24-country tournament with a group stage that would ensure every participant played at least two matches, this was abandoned when the field was expanded to 32 participants, opting instead for a single knockout tournament. All matches were played inside a glass cage that contained a number of pieces of furniture acting as obstacles, and simulating the home environment in which the keep-up game is usually played.

List of competitors
All of the competitors were announced as the representatives of their country.

Replaced competitors

Tournament bracket

Reaction
After Francesco de la Cruz won the tournament, he was congratulated on social media by President of Peru Pedro Castillo.

Awards and nominations

References

2021 in Spanish sport
International sports competitions hosted by Spain
Ballooning competitions
2021 in air sports